Capra e fagioli (Goat and beans) or Stufato di capra e fagioli (Stew of goat meat and beans) is a typical dish of the hinterland of Imperia.

Capra e fagioli is a stew made from goat meat (preferably shoulder meat), cooked over a long period over a low heat with aromas, vegetables (onions, carrots, celery) white wine and, in the last part of cooking, white beans, preferably Pigna beans.

See also
 List of Italian dishes
 List of stews
 Cuisine of Liguria

References

Cuisine of Liguria
Legume dishes
Goat dishes